Barry Fitzgerald (born 1972) is an Irish author and paranormal investigator, and was the lead investigator on the SyFy paranormal investigative cable TV show, Ghost Hunters International.

Fitzgerald was born in the city of Lisburn, County Antrim, Northern Ireland. He has had over three decades of experience as an investigator of the supernatural.

It was written that Fitzgerald mysteriously vanished in 2016 during a covert expedition within the Iron Mountains in Ireland, searching for a Neolithic doorway to an other-world written about in an 8th-century manuscript uncovered in Trinity College, Dublin. Fitzgerald himself debunked this claim on the podcast Stirring the Cauldron hosted by Marla Brooks. It is unknown who reported this or why.

Fitzgerald is versed in several languages, including but not likely limited to French, Latin, German, and Romanian.

Television appearances

References

External links
 
 
 Barry Fitzgerald @ Twitter
 Bio at SyFy GHI page
 Ghost Hunters International at SyFy

1972 births
Living people
Fitzgerald, Barry
Ghost Hunters (TV series)